Pure is the debut EP by The Jesus Lizard, released in 1989.  The cover artwork was by bassist David Wm. Sims.  This is the only record by the Jesus Lizard recorded with a drum machine.  Drummer Mac McNeilly was added to the group soon after it was recorded.  

The song "Blockbuster" was sung by bassist David Wm. Sims and was covered by the Melvins, with David Yow on vocals, on their album The Crybaby.

Track listing
"Blockbuster" (3:30)
"Bloody Mary" (1:59)
"Rabid Pigs" (2:09)
"Starlet" (2:42)
"Breaking Up Is Hard to Do" or "Happy Bunny Goes Fluff-Fluff Along" - 3:52

Personnel
The Jesus Lizard
Duane Denison - guitar
David Wm. Sims - bass, vocals on "Blockbuster"
David Yow - vocals

References

1989 debut EPs
The Jesus Lizard albums
Touch and Go Records EPs
Albums produced by Steve Albini